A. caudata may refer to:
 Aechmea caudata, a plant species native to Brazil
 Artanthe caudata, a synonym for Piper marginatum, the cake bush, Anesi wiwiri, marigold pepper, Ti Bombé in Creole or Hinojo, a plant species found in moist, shady spots in the Amazon rainforest in Surinam, French Guiana and Brazil

See also 
 Caudata (disambiguation)